The MozART group is a cabaret and comedy string quartet based in Warsaw, Poland, known for its unique approach of classical music. The MozART group is a frequent TV guest including international galas and concerts.

Awards and recognition
The quartet received prestigious prizes like the Grand Prix of the XVIII Festival of Satire and Comedy in Lidzbark; "Pingwin z brazu" (the Bronze Penguin) – the prize given by the cabaret community of Zielona Gora, an informal capitol of Polish cabaret and two Golden Troughs at the Ryjek Festival in Rybnik/Poland. In July 2010 the MozART group was awarded a special prize from the Ministry of Culture of the Republic of Poland for outstanding achievements and 15 years on stage. The 31st European Humor Festival GAGY in Slovakia awarded the MozART group with the 2011 Grand Prix. In March 2013 the MozART group was awarded all three main prizes at the 10th "Festival des Artes Burlesques" in St.Etienne/France: the Grand Prix of the Jury, the Audience Award and the Press Award.

A notable act is Jaślar playing Georges Bizet's "Habanera" from Carmen by simultaneously playing the tune with left hand pizzicato, singing the soprano part, playing the rhythm with a ping pong ball on a paddle and balancing on one leg.

On December 11th, 2021 the MozART group performed for the 150th time in Paris within six years. This time at the Bobino Theater in Montparnasse. The quartet is the first Polish artist in history to have given such a large number of concerts in France's capital.

Discography

Studio albums

Video albums

Movies 
 1999: Chłopaki nie płaczą
 2006: Miłość w przejściu podziemnym

Awards 
 1997 Grand Prix XVIII Biesiad Satyry i Humoru "Złota szpilka" / Poland
 1998 & 2000: second prize at the PAKA festival in Kraków / Poland 1998 i 2000
 2001: "The bronze penguin", Zielona Góra / Poland
 2002: Grand Prix at the Good Humour Festival in Gdańsk
 October 2009: Two golden Golden Troughs at the Ryjek Festival in Rybnik/Poland
 July 2010: Special Award from the Ministry of Culture of the Republic of Poland for outstanding achievements and 15 years on stage
 August 28, 2011: Grand Prix at the 31st GAGY Festival of Humor and Satire in Kremnica / Slovakia www.gagy.eu
 March 2013: all three main prizes at the 10th "Festival des Artes Burlesques" in St. Etienne/France: the Grand Prix of the Jury, the Audience Award and the Press Award

References
  
 Additional
 Britsch, Eckhard, "Durchgeknallt, aber geistvoll", Mannheimer Morgen, 27. July 2010
 Eberts, Volker "MozART Group gastiert in Meggen", Westdeutschen Allgemeinen Zeitung, 13 November 2009
 Sveriges Television, Allsång på Skansen, 29 June 2010
 Vogel, Günter, "Persiflage", Schwäbische Zeitung, 26 May 2009 (reprinted on www.mozartgroup.org)
 Warsaw Voice, "On a Wry Note", 26 January 2005

External links
 MozART group Official website
 YouTube Channel

Polish musical groups
Comedy musical groups
String quartets
Musical groups established in 1995
1995 establishments in Poland